Rufo López Fresquet (1911 – August 2, 1983) was a distinguished Cuban economist who became Fidel Castro's first Minister of Finance from 1959 to 1960.

Married to an American, his wife and sons Antonio and Victor fled to the United States in 1960. He later wrote a book, My 14 Months with Castro, that attempted to shed light on the origins of the Cuban revolution and the reasons behind Castro's new government becoming communist. As Minister of the Treasury, Lopez-Fresquet made concerted efforts to work with American companies after the new government came to power, hoping to gain the interest of investors. According to one source, "Cuban Minister of Finances Rufo Lopez Fresquet [told] Bohemia magazine, ”I met more  220 presidents of US corporations... Eastern, Pan American, Pepsi-Cola, Sinclair, Remington Rand, National Can and many other US corporations [were] interested in Cuba."

Few of Castro's original ministers and cabinet members survived the tumult following the revolution by which Castro took power. "Of the twenty-one ministers appointed in January 1959, twelve had resigned or had been ousted by the end of the year. Four more would go out in 1960 as the revolution moved toward a Marxist-Leninist political system."

According to Time Magazine, only Lopez-Fresquet "survived the shake-up" that removed non-communists from Castro's inner circle. "Fighting growing Red influence, the moderates had been meeting every Thursday with Castro for skull sessions warning that his monstrous agrarian reform was devouring the Cuban economy. A few weeks ago, Pazos, Ray and Perez found that they were being followed by Castro's secret police and guessed that the game was lost... [Lopez-Fresquet] had already asked to be allowed to resign next month."

In 2005, Rufo Lopez-Fresquet was portrayed in the movie The Lost City by actor Carlos Menendez.

References

Finance ministers of Cuba
Cuban economists
1911 births
1983 deaths